Abu Musa ‘Isa Ibn Mina al-Zarqi, better known as Qalun (120-220AH), was a significant figure in the spread of the Qira'at, or variant methods for recitation of the Qur'an. Being one of the two primary transmitters of the canonical method of Nafi‘ al-Madani, Qalun's recitation is currently the norm for Qur'an reading in mosques in Qatar as well as parts of Libya and Tunisia, and is quite popular among West Africans. The method of Qalun and his counterpart Warsh was also the most popular method of recitation in Islamic Spain.

Because he was deaf, he would detect and correct his students' mistakes, according to ibn Abu Khatim, by reading their lips; according to Yaqut, by getting so close to the student's mouth with his ear. He was born in Medina in the year 738, and he died there in 835.

See also

Ten readers and transmitters 
Nafi‘ al-Madani
Qalun
Warsh
Ibn Kathir al-Makki
Al-Bazzi
Qunbul
Abu 'Amr ibn al-'Ala'
Ad-Duri
Al-Susi
Ibn Amir ad-Dimashqi
Hisham
Ibn Dhakwan
Aasim ibn Abi al-Najud
Shu'bah
Hafs
Hamzah az-Zaiyyat
Khalaf
Khallad
Al-Kisa'i
Al-Layth
Ad-Duri
Abu Ja'far
'Isa ibn Waddan
Ibn Jummaz
Ya'qub al-Yamani
Ruways
Rawh
Khalaf]]
Ishaq
Idris

References

835 deaths
Quranic readings